BMB Group (formerly Brunei Merchant Bank) is an advisory and asset management platform for ruling families and Forbes 500 investors. In 2015 the firm refocused its business to provide capital and specialist advice exclusively for Forbes 500 families. The company works only with ultra high-net-worth investors in private off-market initiatives. providing specialist advice in the form of business development and strategic advisory services, with a focus on emerging markets of Asia, Latin America, CIS and the Middle East.

In an investigative report, Euromoney described BMB as "one of the world’s most exclusive financial institutions. The group calls to mind an era when courts of Asian empires were the global centers of money, technology, culture and power. Its growing number of investors are drawn from eastern ruling families with vast riches gleaned from the long term growth demand for commodities."

The firm was founded in 2006 by prominent financier Rayo Withanage, originally an attorney and strategist who developed a successful career as a direct investor. Mr. Withanage, who was named in the Financial Times 100 rising stars of finance, recently handed the reins of BMB to new CEO Mr. Rahula Withanage.

BMB and its affiliates have invested upwards of US$12 billion around the world in the areas of private equity,  real estate, natural resources, wealth management, hospitality and philanthropy.

BMB is headquartered in Bermuda.

References

External links
 

Investment management companies of Bermuda
Financial services companies established in 2006